Dinnertime is the second album by Alex Taylor, brother of James, Livingston and Kate Taylor. The album was recorded at Muscle Shoals Sound Studio. The standout tracks are "Change Your Sexy Ways", Randy Newman's "Lets Burn Down the Cornfield", Scott Boyer's "Comin' Back to You", and Stephen Stills' "Four Days Gone".

Track listing
"Change Your Sexy Ways"  (Alex Taylor, Chuck Leavell, Jimmy Nalls) - 7:07
"Let's Burn Down the Cornfield"  (Randy Newman) - 4:25
"Comin' Back to You"  (Scott Boyer) - 4:15
"Four Days Gone"  (Stephen Stills) - 3:56
"Payday"  (Jesse Winchester) - 4:53
"Who's Been Talking?"  (Howlin' Wolf) - 4:45
"Who Will the Next Fool Be?"  (Charlie Rich) - 4:50
"From a Buick Six"  (Bob Dylan) - 4:54

Personnel
Alex Taylor - vocals
Scott Boyer - guitar, backing vocals
Chuck Leavell - piano, keyboards, vibraphone
Paul Hornsby - organ, keyboards
Johnny Sandlin - bass, Moog synthesizer
Wayne Perkins - bass, guitar, slide guitar
John Hughey - steel guitar
Jimmy Nalls - guitar
Charlie Hayward - bass
Jaimoe - percussion, conga, timbales
Bill Stewart - drums
Roger Hawkins - percussion, conga, tambourine
Lou Mullenix - percussion, timbales
Earl Sims - percussion
Charles Chalmers - backing vocals
Sandra Chalmers - backing vocals
Ginger Holladay - backing vocals
Mary Holladay - backing vocals
Donna Rhodes - backing vocals
Sandra Rhodes - backing vocals
Temple Riser - backing vocals
Steve Smith - backing vocals

Production
Producer: Johnny Sandlin
Recording Engineer: Steve Smith, Johnny Sandlin
Remixing: Johnny Sandlin, Jeff Willens, Richard Rosebrough, Danny Tuberville
Photography: Barry Feinstein, Tom Wilkes
Executive Supervisor: Phil Walden

References

Alex Taylor (musician) albums
Capricorn Records albums
Covers albums
1972 albums